The Rivière du Moulin (English: river of the Mill), also called Rivière Langevin, is a tributary of the Saguenay River. Its mouth is located in the Rivière-du-Moulin district, in the east of the Chicoutimi borough in Saguenay. The river is known for its urban park, the Rivière-du-Moulin park, located on its banks near its mouth.

The upper part of the Moulin river valley is served by the forest roads R0287 and by a secondary road descending part of the valley; this upper part is also indirectly served by the route 175 which passes on the west side. A few other secondary forest roads serve the "rivière du Moulin" valley, mainly for forestry and recreational tourism activities.

In addition to the urban and industrial area, crossing the Chicoutimi sector of the city of Saguenay, forestry is the main economic activity in this valley; recreational tourism, second.

The surface of the Moulin river is usually frozen from the beginning of December to the end of March, however the safe circulation on the ice is generally made from mid-December to mid-March, except in the rapids zone.

Toponymy 
The "rivière du Moulin" takes its name from the Sawmill built by Peter McLeod father around 1810 on the river, while he was employed by the Company North West. This name is mentioned for the first time in 1827. The name "Langevin" comes from the Langevin family who formerly owned a flour mill near its mouth. For their part, the Montagnais used the designation "Papawitish" to designate the river. From Le Gardeur de Tilly's report in 1725 until 1825, half a dozen explorers will use this name. "Papawitish" would mean "beaver about 2 to 3 years old" in innu-aimun.

The toponym "Rivière du Moulin" was formalized on December 5, 1968, at the Place Names Bank of the Commission de toponymie du Québec.

Geography

Course 
It originates in the Lac du Moulin in the Laurentides Wildlife Reserve. This lake is mainly fed by the outlet (coming from the south-east) from Lake Andrevos and by a stream coming from the east. This lake is located at:
  south-east of lac de l'Enfer;
  south-west of the course of the rivière à Mars North-West;
  north-east of route 175;
  north-east of the course of the Pikauba River;
  south-east of the confluence of the "rivière du Moulin" and the Saguenay River.

Upper course of the rivière du Moulin (segment of )

  towards the northwest by collecting the discharge (coming from the south) of lakes Calliope, Strachan and Riant, as well as the discharge (coming from the west) of the Dolo pond, in forming a curve towards the southwest by skirting a mountain whose summit reaches , up to the outlet (coming from the east) of lakes Guérin and Bellefeuille;
  towards the northeast by collecting the outlet (coming from the southwest) of Lake Ogy, up to the outlet (coming from the east) of two lakes;
  towards the north by forming a curve towards the west to go around a mountain, up to a stream (coming from the east);
  to the northwest in a deep valley along the forest road R0215 to a stream (coming from the west) then to the northeast to another stream (coming from the northwest);
  towards the north-east then forking eastwards around a mountain whose summit reaches ;
  towards the north-east by forming a loop towards the south-east, up to Bras sec (coming from the north-west);

Intermediate course of the rivière du Moulin (segment of )

  towards the north by winding up to the outlet (coming from the south-east) of Lac Coupau;
  north-west passing in front of the hamlet Sector-Charlevoix, to the outlet (coming from the south-west) of lakes Lanz, Rond and Éclats;
  towards the northwest by forming a curve towards the southwest in the middle of the segment to go around a mountain, up to Bras de Jacob (coming from the west) ;
  towards the north-east, forming a curve towards the west at the start of the segment, along part of the Quatre-Milles road, up to a bend corresponding to the point an island;

Lower course of the rivière du Moulin (segment of )

  first towards the east until a bend where the current passes under the railway bridge, then towards the north-east by collecting the outlet of Lake Saint-Gelais, along the chemin de la Chaîne and meandering up to the bridge on rue Gauthier, in the village of Laterrière;
  to the north by crossing a few rapids, collecting the outlet (coming from the south-east) from Lac des Pères, collecting a stream (coming from the south-east) and following the street Notre-Dame (continuity of Chemin de l'Église (Laterrière)) to the bridge of Chemin Saint-Isidore (Laterrière);
  to the north by collecting the outlet of Lac des Prés, along Chemin de l'Église (Laterrière) and meandering to the bridge at route 170;
  north along chemin du rang Sainte-Famille, passing under the two bridges of autoroute 50 and crossing the falls at Martel at the end of the segment, to a road bridge;
  to the northwest in the agricultural zone, passing under the railway bridge, then meandering passing in the Parc de la Rivière-du-Moulin on the east side of the center -City of Chicoutimi, to the highway bridge on Boulevard de l'Université Est;
  northwards in urban areas, crossing Langevin Falls and passing under the bridge on boulevard du Saguenay Est at the end of the segment, to its mouth.

The "rivière du Moulin" flows on the south-eastern bank of the Saguenay River in the "Rivière-du-Moulin" district northeast of downtown Saguenay.

From the mouth of the Moulin river, the current follows the course of the Saguenay River on  eastwards to Tadoussac where it meets with the Saint Lawrence Estuary.

Hydrology 
In all, it has  permanent rivers,  intermittent,  lakes, 2 reservoirs and 378 wetlands.
The main tributaries of the river are the rivers Croft, Fortin-Gobeil, Pedneault-Maltais, Romuald-Simard, de la Savane, Tremblay-Saint-Gelais, the Maltais stream and the Pères stream as well as the Bras de Jacob, "Jacob Ouest et Sec". The two most important lakes are Lac du Moulin and Grand Lac.

Geology 
The "rivière du Moulin" crosses two geomorphological regions; the Laurentian Mountains) and the lowlands of the Saguenay from Laterrière and downstream.

Population 
All residents are residents of the city of Saguenay.

Notes and references

Photographic gallery

See also 

 Chicoutimi, an urban sector
 Saguenay, a city
 Rivière-du-Moulin (Quartier), an urban district
 Laterrière, an urban area
 Le Fjord-du-Saguenay Regional County Municipality
 Zec Mars-Moulin, a ZEC
 Laurentides Wildlife Reserve
 Rivière-du-Moulin Park, an urban park
 Bras de Jacob, a stream
 Bras Sec, a stream
 List of rivers of Quebec

Bibliography 
 .

External links 

 Rivière-du-Moulin Park

Rivers of Saguenay–Lac-Saint-Jean
Geography of Saguenay, Quebec
Le Fjord-du-Saguenay Regional County Municipality
Laurentides Wildlife Reserve